Where Are You Going Moshé? (French title: Où vas-tu Moshé?, Arabic title: فين ماشي ياموشي - Fin Mashi Ya Moshe?) is a Moroccan-Canadian film directed by Hassan Benjelloun and released in 2007. Set up in the small town of Boujad, the movie depicts the turmoil created in a small town after the exodus of the Jews of Morocco, especially between the last Jew in town, Shlomo, and the owner of the only bar in the town, Mustapha. The film, although a work of fiction, is shot in the style of a documentary. The plot was largely inspired by an original script by Ahmed Seffar Andaloussi.

Plot 
Mustapha is the manager of the only bar in the small town of Boujad, in Morocco. The Islamic authorities in the town are eager to close it because consumption of alcohol is prohibited to the Muslims, but they cannot do anything since the city remains inhabited by a Jewish community. As long as there are customers who are allowed to consume alcohol, Mustapha is free to go on with his business. But when Moroccan Jews are starting to immigrate to the new state of Israel, and as the town is emptied of its Jewish community, Mustapha is terrified about having to close his business. He will attempt the impossible to keep the only remaining Jew in Boujad, Shlomo Bensoussan—whose wife Freha and daughter Rachel moved to Israel—from leaving the town.

Cast 

 Simon Elbaz as Shlomo Bensoussan
 Abdelkader Lotfi as Mustapha
 Malika El Hamaoui as Zaina
 Hamadi Tounsi as Moshe
 Rim Shmaou as Rachel Bensoussan
 Ilham Loulidi as Freha Bensoussan
 Hassan Essakalli as Abdelsammad
 Abderrahim Bargache as The Rabbi

References 

2007 films
Films about Jews and Judaism
2000s French-language films
Films about Moroccan Jews
2000s Arabic-language films
2007 drama films
2007 multilingual films
Moroccan multilingual films